Karolina Gočeva represented Macedonia in the 2002 Eurovision Song Contest with the song "Od nas zavisi" after winning the national final selection, for the Eurovision Song Contest 2002.

Before Eurovision

Skopje Fest 2002 
The final was held on 16 February 2002 at the Macedonian National Theatre in Skopje, hosted by Igor Džambazov. The winner was chosen by a combination of votes from the audience in the hall (20%), televoting (40%) and an expert jury (40%). Other participants included Andrijana Janevska who was the runner-up with the French lyrics song "O šeri, mon šeri" (O cherie mon cherie) and Risto Samardžiev who came third with "Nema veke pesni tazni".

At Eurovision
Karolina Gočeva performed 9th on the night of the contest, following Estonia and preceding Israel. At the close of the voting she had received 25 points, placing 19th in a field of 24, thus relegating Macedonia from the 2003 contest.

Voting

References

2002
Countries in the Eurovision Song Contest 2002
Eurovision